A leadership election was held in the Liberal Democratic Party of Japan on 28 September 2009 after the incumbent party leader and outgoing Prime Minister of Japan Tarō Asō announced that he would resign after losing badly in the general election held on 30 August 2009. Asō announced on 8 September he would resign on 16 September 2009, which he did as planned.

Candidates
Endorsement by at least twenty LDP lawmakers is necessary to become a candidate in the election. Since there are 387 LDP Diet members and 141 prefectural LDP representatives (three for each of the 47 prefectural chapters), there is a total of 528 votes.

Former finance minister Sadakazu Tanigaki announced on 13 September 2009 he would stand in the election. Tanigaki had also been a candidate in the 2006 leadership election, where he came in third place behind Shinzō Abe and Tarō Asō. Yasutoshi Nishimura and Tarō Kōno (son of former LDP leader Yōhei Kōno) are the other two announced candidates.

Farm minister Shigeru Ishiba was also considered a possible candidate, but he did not stand.

Campaign
A public debate was held on 19 September 2009. Tanigaki was elected with 300 of 498 ballots.

Results

 1 invalid vote

References

2009 elections in Japan
Political party leadership elections in Japan
Liberal Democratic Party (Japan)
Indirect elections
Liberal Democratic Party (Japan) leadership election